Seyyed Mohammad-Ali Emam-Shooshtari (1902 - 1972) was a prominent Iranian historian and religious scholar.

Biography 
Shooshatri was born in 1902 A.D. in Shushtar, Iran. Most of his ancestors were religious scholars the most prominent of which is Seyyed Nematollah Jazayeri and Seyyed Abdullah, who was the head of assembly at Mugan plain and he wrote the coronation speech of Nader Shah Afshar. He was the son of Seyyed Mohammad Sharif, Friday Emam of Shushtar and 8th descendant of Seyyed Nematollah Jazayeri. His mother was Sareh Beigum, the granddaughter of famous shia scholar, Sheikh Jafar Shooshtari who lived at the time of Naser al-Din Shah Qajar. His paternal lineage was as follows: Mohammad-Ali son of Seyyed Mohammad Sharif son of Hajj Seyyed Mohammad Emam Jomeh son of Seyyed Hassan Emam Jomeh son of Seyyed Abdolkarim Emam Jomeh son of Seyyed Mohammad Javad son of Seyyed Abdullah son of Seyyed Noor Al-Din son of Seyyed Nematollah Jazayeri.

After finishing Shia religious studies to the degree of Ijtihad, he studied history of Arab literature under the supervision of his uncle Shaikh Mohammad Kazem Shushtari and his brother Seyyed Noor Aldin Emam Shooshtari. He then studied English language and became an employee of Ministry of Maaref. He worked as a teacher first. Then moved to Ministry of holdings. He was subsequently transferred to Tehran office of Customs. He was subsequently promoted to the head of Customs office. He was fluent in Persian, Arabic and English. He became the head of Arabic section of Pahlavi library and he collaborated with Zabih Behrouz. In 1971 he was awarded by the Shah of Iran for his books and articles. He was an expert on the early history of Islam. He made many speeches on Iranian  about the early Muslim commanders who were often thought be Arab but were of Persian descent. He was diagnosed with cancer in his last few years and subsequently died due to the complications of cancer.

Books 
 Geographical history of Khuzestan
 History of scales and currencies in Islamic governments
 Encyclopedia of Persian words in Arabic
 Translation of "Advices of Ardeshir Babakan" from Arabic to Persian.
 Iran, the land of science and art
 History of Kingship in Kingdom of Iran
 A chapter in "Water and Watering in Ancient Persia"

Articles 
 History of Music in Islam
 Khuzestan in current and ancient times
 Persian gulf and the history of lighthouses 
 Philosophical origins of kingship in Iran
 Seven cities of Madaen
 Mazdak and his religion
 Contribution of Iranians in early advancements of Islam
 Immense contribution of Sasanid literature in Abbasid litareature
 Influences of Iranian architecture on Islamic architecture
 Influence of Iranian culture on the Arabs
 Save the Persian language
 Why we don't care about the Persian language?
 Economic resources of Persian gulf
 Iranian painting arts in early Islamic periods

External links 
 Archive of books and articles by Mohammad-Ali Emam-Shooshtari (in Persian).

References 
 Emam-Shooshtari, Seyyed Mohammad-Ali & Shahidi, Yahya, Twelve historical documents, Magazine of Arteshtaran, No 10, Tehran, Artesh Press (In Persian).

 
1902 births
1972 deaths
People from Shushtar
Iranian Shia scholars of Islam
20th-century Iranian historians